Vrindavan Society is the largest residential complex in Thane, Maharashtra, India, developed by a venture of Mittal and Raheja Developers. The first building in this 100+ apartment building complex was constructed in 1984 and the project was completed in the early 90s. This complex is now considered to be centrally located with rapid development of Thane.

Location
The society is approximately 3 kilometers away from the Thane railway station and is accessible via public transportation, buses and rickshaws. Brindavan is well connected to various parts of Thane, Mumbai and Navi Mumbai by TMT and MSRTC buses. There are morning peak hour MSRTC buses to Borivali, South Bombay, Haj Ali, Panvel and Andheri from the complex.

Facilities
Brindavan is generally considered to be a safe neighborhood  and has a number of schools (pre schools / kindergartens / high schools) in the vicinity. There are also a number of grocery stores, dry cleaners, internet cafes, health clubs and eateries in the complex. It also has good healthcare facility like family Physician, Maternity Home, Surgical Nursing Home, Ultrasonography Clinics, Pathology Laboratory & number of dental clinics.

Brindavan has all the amenities like Banks, Departmental stores, driving Schools, Badal Power laundry, Hotels, Clinics, Hospitals, Bus service, Good doctors, Beauty parlour, salons, play grounds for children, Nana nani park and Gyms (Including one open Gym in the Central Garden created by local Corpoator Mr. Milind Patankar), Polibhaji kendras for homely food, shops for all items, and importantly Hanuman Mandir which is like the Gramdevata mandir for all the residents.

Culture
Although located in a large city which is considered to be mainly Maharashtrian, the residents of Brindavan are multi-lingual and cosmopolitan. The internal roads are all concretized and the society has 24 hours water supply. Residents celebrate all the festivals together irrespective of religions like Diwali, Christmas, Ganesh Mahostav, Durga Puja, Eid, etc.

References

External links
- Mittal Builders Webpage

Neighbourhoods in Thane